Qaba ( qabā) is a long coat with sleeves and buttons, similar to a cassock, open at the front. A qaba is similar to a wadded coat. It is considered as a piece of clothing of Turkic origin.

The Mughal emperors wore ankle-length garments. The outfits during the reign of Babur and Humayun are more or less the same, i.e. qaba, jama, pirahan, jilucha, jiba and kasaba. Unlike the jama, which was a four-pointed long-coat the Qaba and takauchia were of a broad girth at the bottom. There are mentions of the qaba in the Baburnama. At present, Qaba is one of the essential parts of the dress of the Islamic clerics or mosque leaders.

See also 
 Ammama
 Chiltah

Gallery

References 

Clothing
Indian clothing
Iranian clothing